TRM may refer to:

Government
 Technical Reference Model, for the United States' federal government
 Teleradio-Moldova, Moldovan state broadcaster

Places
 Trimley railway station, Suffolk, England (by GBR code)

Science and technology
 Thermoremanent magnetization, in geology
 Time reversal mirror, in physics and telecommunications
 TRM cell or tissue-resident memory T cell, in biology

See also
 TRMS (disambiguation)